Gilavan (also Romanized as Gīlavān; also known as Kīlvān) is a village in Shal Rural District, Shahrud District, Khalkhal County, Ardabil Province, Iran. At the 2006 census, its population was 245, in 92 families.

References 

Tageo

Towns and villages in Khalkhal County